Han So-hee (born Lee So-hee (이소희); November 18, 1994) is a South Korean actress and model. She began her career as a supporting character in the television series Money Flower (2017), 100 Days My Prince (2018), and Abyss (2019) before transitioning into lead roles in the JTBC series The World of the Married (2020) and Nevertheless (2021), and the Netflix-produced My Name (2021). Her portrayal of Yeo Da-kyung in The World of the Married (2020) gained her wide recognition.

Early life
Han was born as Lee So-hee on November 18, 1994, in Ulsan, South Korea. She attended Ulsan Girls' High School and Ulsan High School of Arts.

Career

2017–2019: Career beginnings
Han appeared in SHINee's "Tell Me What To Do" music video in 2016. She made her acting debut in a minor role in Reunited Worlds (2017). She got her first main roles in MBC TV's Money Flower in 2017 and tvN's 100 Days My Prince in 2018. Later in 2018, she starred in KBS2's After The Rain and made an appearance in Roy Kim's "The Hardest Part". In 2019, Han played a supporting role in the tvN series Abyss, alongside lead actors Ahn Hyo-seop and Park Bo-young.

2020: Wide recognition through The World of the Married
In 2020, Han starred in JTBC's smash-hit The World of the Married alongside Kim Hee-ae and Park Hae-joon in which she played a main role as a young mistress. The drama ended its run as the highest-rated drama in Korean cable television history. Han received widespread recognition thanks to the drama's huge success.

2021–present: Lead roles
In 2021, Han starred in JTBC romance drama Nevertheless alongside Song Kang. Later the same year, she starred in the Netflix original crime-action drama My Name as a woman seeking revenge for her father's murder.

In 2022, Han appeared in the four-episode Disney+ mini-series Soundtrack #1 alongside Park Hyung-sik.

Filmography

Television series

Web series

Music video

Awards and nominations

Listicles

References

External links

 
 
 
 Han So-hee at Naver Blog

1994 births
Living people
South Korean actresses
South Korean television actresses
South Korean women television presenters
21st-century South Korean actresses
South Korean female models
People from Ulsan
Actresses from Seoul